Boomer's was a jazz club in Greenwich Village, New York City, during the 1970s. The club was a venue for bebop music. Musicians including Barry Harris, Kenny Barron, Art Farmer, and Cedar Walton played the club,  and live albums including Walton's A Night at Boomers, Vol. 1 and A Night at Boomers, Vol. 2, and Art Farmer Quintet at Boomers were recorded at the club. After Boomer's closed, the space was the location of Manatus, a Greek diner, for three decades.

See also
List of jazz venues in the United States

References

Defunct jazz clubs in New York City
Music venues in Manhattan
Jazz clubs in New York City